The Rose and the Jackal is a 1990 American made-for-television Western adventure film produced by TNT starring Christopher Reeve and Madolyn Smith. The plot revolves around Union agent Allan Pinkerton, played by Reeve, falling in love with female spy Rose O'Neal Greenhow.

The film's title served as the inspiration for the name of the Order of the Confederate Rose, a women's auxiliary to the Sons of Confederate Veterans.

References

External links 
 

1990 films
1990s adventure films
Films directed by Jack Gold
American Civil War spy films
TNT Network original films
Cultural depictions of Allan Pinkerton
1990s English-language films
1990s American films